Banbridge RFC (Banbridge Rugby Football Club) is a rugby union club based in Banbridge, County Down, Northern Ireland, in the province of Ulster. It currently plays in Division 1B of the Energia All-Ireland League after gaining promotion in 2017 and Division 1 of the SONI Premiership. In addition to the senior team, the club fields another 5 adult junior-standard teams, and youth U18, U16 and U14 teams, as well as a large mini & Maxi rugby section, Mixed Ability Rugby Team named The Barbarians, a Girls/ Ladies Section.

Formation
Late in 1925, a group of former Banbridge Academy pupils interested in the game of rugby, got together to form a team to play Newry. The date of that historic first game was 2 January 1926. One of the players in that first game was F. E. McWilliam; later the well known Irish surrealist sculptor.

Banbridge spent the next 72 years in the ranks of Ulster junior rugby, with mixed fortunes.

Honours
 All Ireland League 2A Winners: 1
 2016-2017
 Ulster Towns Cup: 3
 1932–33, 1988–89, 1992–93
 Ulster Junior Cup: 1
 1989-90

Senior status
At the end of the 1997–98 season, Banbridge won the round-robin play-offs against the other provincial qualifying champions Naas, Monivea and Midleton. Their victory secured promotion to Division Four of the All Ireland League for the 1998–99 season. They have remained as an AIL senior club since then. In the 2016–2017 season Banbridge gained promotion to AIL 1B.

Touring team
 The club also have a touring team called the Bluesox that have travelled to Oldham, Newcastle, Cardiff, Edinburgh, The Netherlands, Isle of Man, Czech Republic, Uxbridge, Estonia, Blackpool. Germany, Devon, Germany, Portugal, Irvine, Italy, Leeds, Cardiff, Aylesbury, Bristol, Newcastle,  Galway, Carlise and Spain since 1997. In 2020 the tour to Edinburgh was postponed to 2021 due to the Corona Virus Pandemic.

Notable current players

 Eric O'Sullivan, Ulster rugby union team
 Rob Lyttle, Ulster rugby union team
 James Hume, Ulster rugby union team
 Greg Jones, Ulster rugby union team
 Nick Timoney, Ulster rugby union team
 Luke Marshall, Ulster rugby union team and Ireland national rugby union team
 David O'Connor, Ulster rugby union team
 Jonny Murphy, Connacht rugby union team

Notable past players

 Tyrone Howe, Ireland and British and Irish Lions
 Simon Best, Ireland
 Rory Best, Ulster rugby union team, Ireland national rugby union team and British and Irish Lions

Sources

External links
Banbridge RFC

Rugby union clubs in Northern Ireland
Irish rugby union teams
Rugby clubs established in 1925
Rugby union clubs in County Down
Senior Irish rugby clubs (Ulster)
RFC